The 2003–04 season was Manchester United's 12th season in the Premier League, and their 29th consecutive season in the top division of English football.

United started the season by winning the 2003 FA Community Shield and then secured a record eleventh FA Cup with a 3–0 win over Millwall at the Millennium Stadium in Cardiff. However, the club surrendered the Premier League title to unbeaten champions Arsenal, with a second-half dip in league form coinciding with Rio Ferdinand starting an eight-month ban from football due to a missed drugs test and restricting United to a third-place finish.

New to the United side were Portuguese winger Cristiano Ronaldo, Brazilian 2002 FIFA World Cup-winning midfielder Kléberson, American goalkeeper Tim Howard, Cameroonian midfielder Eric Djemba-Djemba and French striker David Bellion.

United's UEFA Champions League and League Cup dreams ended in the last 16, with the European exit being particularly painful as a last minute goal by eventual champions Porto put them out of the competition and denied them an eighth successive Champions League quarter-final.

Pre-season and friendlies

FA Community Shield

FA Premier League

FA Cup

League Cup

UEFA Champions League

Group stage

Knockout phase

Squad statistics

Transfers
United's first departure of the 2003–04 season was David Beckham, who left Old Trafford after ten years with the Red Devils. On 7 July, forward Danny Webber joined Watford. A month after Webber's departure, Argentinian midfielder, Juan Sebastián Verón joined United's rivals Chelsea. Two days later, English forward Jimmy Davis died in a car crash.

Coming in during the summer transfer window were French forward David Bellion, Cameroonian midfielder Eric Djemba-Djemba, American goalkeeper Tim Howard, Brazilian midfielder Kléberson, and Portuguese winger Cristiano Ronaldo.

Leaving in the winter transfer window was Alan Tate, who joined Swansea City. First-choice goalkeeper Fabien Barthez rejoined Marseille in April, while Danny Pugh joined Leeds United in late May, in exchange for Alan Smith.

Arriving in the winter transfer window was Louis Saha, who signed from Fulham on 23 January for a fee of £12.82 million. Alan Smith joined United on 26 May from Leeds United in exchange for Danny Pugh (see above). Gabriel Heinze joined United on 11 June from Paris Saint-Germain for a fee of £6.9 million.

In

Out

Loan out

Notes

References

Manchester United F.C. seasons
Manchester United